The Adobe Mountain Desert Park a.k.a. "The Railroad Park" is a park complex that houses the Sahuaro Central Railroad Heritage preservation Society, Sahuaro Central Railroad Museum, Arizona Model Railroading Society, and the Maricopa Live Steamers. The approximately 160-acre Adobe Mountain Desert Railroad Park is located south of Pinnacle Peak Road on 43rd Avenue in the City of Glendale, Arizona. 

In addition, it has several World War II-era Internment Camp Houses, originally intended as temporary housing at the Leupp Isolation Center. This was an Indian boarding school on the Navajo Nation, which was converted to house Japanese-American internees considered to be troublemakers at other internment camps, after these and other Japanese-American citizens had been forcibly removed from the West Coast.

History
 
In 1989, the Sahuaro Central Railroad Heritage Preservation Society leased an 80-acre parcel of land from the Maricopa Parks and Recreation Department. It created the Adobe Mountain Desert Railroad Park and Museum. The agreement with the parks department required a no-fee lease for a period of twenty-five years, with an option of an additional twenty-five years.

In 1992, the Arizona Model Railroading Society/Arizona Garden Railway Society (AMRS), which were originally established in 1984, had been told to vacate their Scottsdale property. The AMRS believed that the Adobe Mountain Park seemed like the a good area for them to relocate. They presented a request to the Sahuaro Central in that nature. Later that year an agreement was reached between the AMRS and Sahuaro Central.

The Maricopa Live Steamers (MLS), had their operations in the McCormick-Stillman Railroad Park in Scottsdale. They also wanted to enter into an agreement with Sahuaro Central and transfer their operations to the 80 acre parcel of Land which Sahuaro Central had leased. An agreement was reached in 1992.

The board of directors consists of two members from Sahuaro Central and two members from the AMRS and the MLS. The development of the land leased to the Sahuaro Central is controlled by the Sahuaro Central board of directors. This includes improvements of the common areas of the Park, road easements, parking areas, utility easements, etc. Permanent improvements must be approved by the Sahuaro Central Board of Directors, Maricopa County Recreation Services, Maricopa County Flood Control and the permitting agencies of the City of Phoenix.

The Sahuaro Central Railroad Museum

The building which houses the Sahuaro Central headquarters and Sahuaro Central Railroad Museum was once the Park Ranger Station at Adobe Mountain Park. The museum has various exhibits, some which are on loan by the members of the society. These artifacts include train models of different scales, artifacts related to the early years of railroading in Arizona, such as a conductors cap, railroad spikes and lanterns, the bell and headlight of a Porter 0-4-0 18" gauge locomotive and a gift shop. Expansion of the former Ranger Station have been made for meetings and museum operations.

Outside of the museum building there are various steam locomotives on exhibit. One of them is a Porter 0-4-0 is an 18" gauge locomotive that was once used as a copper mining locomotive. Built in Pittsburgh, Pennsylvania in 1887, this locomotive was operated by the Detroit Copper Company at their Morenci, Arizona mine. Another one is a restored mini H.J. Ottaway steam engine built in Wichita, Kansas. Also, on the grounds are four Japanese Internment Camp houses from Leupp, Flagstaff. These houses were built in 1943.

The Arizona Model Railroading Society (AMRS)

Next to the museum building is a twenty by thirty foot (3000 sq. ft.) metal Arizona Model Railroading Society building whose construction was financed by the Sahuaro Central. The building is home to the Huntley HO train layout and to layouts of Arizona Model Railroading Society G, N. and O scales.

The Maricopa Live Steamers (MLS)

The Maricopa Live Steamers organization (MLS) is the oldest of its kind in Arizona. MLS currently owns multiple 7 1/2" gauge train engines, around 50 riding cars, and 20 other cars. From 1996 through 1999, MLS created three miles of track which was placed outside the Sahuaro Central museum. A loop of the track was built around the museum in 1998. As of 2022, MLS has more than 18 miles of 7 1/2" gauge tracks plus 1500 feet of 4 3/4" track. MLS provides free train rides on Sundays during the months of September through May. The train rides begin in Adobe Station and run through the rugged desert. There are working block signals, many bridges, trestles, and a tunnel. MLS's Arizona Western Railroad is one of the largest miniature railroad setup of its kind in the United States. MLS also created an old 1890 western themed town with false fronts on their storage units.

Images of the Adobe Mountain Desert Park
The following photographs are of The Sahuaro Central Railroad Museum, the Arizona Model Railroading Society (AMRS) and the Maricopa Live Steamers (MLS)

See also

 McCormick-Stillman Railroad Park
 List of heritage railroads in the United States
 List of historic properties in Glendale, Arizona
 Catlin Court Historic District
 Manistee Ranch
 Sahuaro Ranch
 USS Arizona salvaged artifacts

References

Parks in Maricopa County, Arizona
Museums in Glendale, Arizona
Railroad museums in Arizona
Model railway shows and exhibitions
7½ in gauge railways